Jayshree Periwal High School is a private high school in Jaipur, Rajasthan, India, and is a part of the Jayshree Periwal Group of Schools. The academic directors of the school are Ayush Periwal and Akriti Periwal and the chairperson of the school is Dr. Jayshree Periwal.

The school was originally named Step By Step High School and was subsequently changed to Jayshree Periwal High School in 2015, after its director Jayshree Periwal. The school teaches to a CBSE syllabus.

History
The school was founded by Jayshree Periwal in April 2002 as a middle school, under the name "Step by Step High School".

Courses, Campus and Facilities
The school offers courses in Science, Commerce and Humanities. It teaches students from pre primary to grade 12. The campus is situated in 50 acres of land in Jaipur, near the Mahindra World City coming up on Ajmer Road. 
The campus offers a range of facilities like basketball courts, badminton courts, indoor swimming pool etc. to students besides the regular ones. It hosts a shooting range as well as a horse riding arena(to be noted the school uses a government facility that is for Common use and is not owned by the school).

References

External links

High schools and secondary schools in Rajasthan
Schools in Jaipur